This is a list of mountains in Croatia.

The highest mountains in Croatia belong to the Dinarides range that is sometimes also called Dinaric Alps, of which Dinara is the highest mountain in Croatia. Together with the easternmost parts of the Alps, these mountains span most of the country, and their orogenic activity started in the Paleozoic with the Variscan orogeny and continued in the Mesozoic and Cenozoic with the Alpine orogeny.

The mountains in the northeastern part of the country, in the Pannonian plain, are considerably older than the rest as their orogeny happened in the Paleozoic.

Mountains in the list are ordered by height.

See also 
 Geography of Croatia
 List of rivers in Croatia
 List of lakes in Croatia
 Croatian Mountaineering Association

Notes

Sources

Further reading 
 Dr. Željko Poljak "Hrvatske planine" Zagreb, 2001.
 Greater Geographical Atlas of Yugoslavia, University Press "Liber", Zagreb (Croatia), 1987.
 Geographical Atlas of the Republic of Croatia, School Book (Zagreb), "Miroslav Krleža" Lexicographical Institute (Zagreb), 1993.

Croatia
Mountains
Croatia